Hernán Segundo Castro Venegas (14 August 1961 – 17 August 2021) was a Chilean professional footballer who played as a left winger for clubs in Chile and Mexico.

Career
As a child, Castro was with Chileno Árabe before joining Audax Italiano youth system, making his professional debut thanks to the coach Hernán Godoy.

A well remembered player of Audax Italiano and Santiago Wanderers in the first half 1980s, in his homeland he also played for Huachipato, Coquimbo Unido, Unión La Calera and Unión San Felipe.

He also had a successful stint with Mexican side Atlético Morelia from 1990 to 1992 in the top division, making thirty one appearances.

Controversies
Owner of a controversial personality, as a professional footballer he used to smoke marijuana and drink alcohol.

At the beginning of his stint with Coquimbo Unido, he spat a referee and was suspended for around 18 matchdays.

Personal life
Castro was better known by his nickname Indio (Indian).

As a player of Morelia, he earned over 30 millions Mexican pesos what he squandered back in Chile. In addition, he was in prison for assaulting his wife.

After his retirement, he worked as a builder, welder and pipe assembler. He fell into a depression and lived in a garbage drump in Cerro Navia commune, despite he sometimes was helped by former colleagues, dying in the street on 17 August 2021.

References

External links
 Hernán Castro at MemoriaWanderers.cl 
 Hernán Castro at PlaymakerStats.com

1961 births
2021 deaths
Footballers from Santiago
Chilean footballers
Chilean expatriate footballers
Chilean Primera División players
Primera B de Chile players
Audax Italiano footballers
Santiago Wanderers footballers
C.D. Huachipato footballers
Coquimbo Unido footballers
Unión La Calera footballers
Unión San Felipe footballers
Liga MX players
Atlético Morelia players
Chilean expatriate sportspeople in Mexico
Expatriate footballers in Mexico
Association football forwards